Waukau is an unincorporated census-designated place in the town of Rushford, in Winnebago County, Wisconsin, United States. The community is located on Wisconsin Highway 116 at its south terminus at Wisconsin Highway 91. As of the 2010 census, its population is 255.

Demographics
As of the census of 2000, the population of Waukau, Wisconsin was 178 people, 85 male and 93 female with a median age of 36.6, 9% under 5 years, 75.8% 18 years and over, and 11.2% 65 years and over.

The racial makeup of Waukau, Wisconsin was 97.8% White, 0.6% Black or African American, and 1.7% Multiracial American. Hispanic or Latino of any race were 2.2% of the population.

Average household size was 2.54.  Average family size was 3.00. Total housing units was 73, 95.9% occupied. Of those occupied, 81.4% were owner-occupied, 18.6% renter occupied. Vacant housing units were 4.1%.

The population 25 years and over was 127, 72.4% a high school graduate or higher, and 7.1% held a bachelor's degree or higher. Civilian veteran population was 20.6%. Disability status of the population 5 years and over was 21.6%.
Married male, except separated, population 15 years and over was 59.4%. Married female, except separated, population 15 years and over was 58.3%.

The population, 16 and over, in the labor force was 61.7%. Mean travel time to work for workers 16 and over was 26.1 minutes. The median household income was $41,042, median family income was $48,750,and per capita income was $16,923. Families below the poverty level was 0%.  Individuals below the poverty level were 4.2%.

Single-family owner-occupied homes was 41 with a median value of $81,400. The median of selected monthly owner costs with a mortgage was $781, not mortgaged was $233.

Notable people

David R. Bean, member of the Wisconsin State Assembly
Darwin Hall, Minnesota state legislator
Erasmus D. Hall, member of the Wisconsin State Assembly
Emmett R. Hicks, Wisconsin Attorney General
Pierce A. Morrissey, member of the Wisconsin State Senate
Asa Rogers, member of the Wisconsin State Assembly
Alson Wood, member of the Wisconsin State Assembly

Images

Notes

Census-designated places in Wisconsin
Census-designated places in Winnebago County, Wisconsin